Vyškov District is a district in the South Moravian Region of the Czech Republic. Its capital is the town of Vyškov.

Administrative division
Vyškov District is divided into three administrative districts of municipalities with extended competence: Vyškov, Bučovice and Slavkov u Brna.

List of municipalities
Towns are marked in bold and market towns in italics:

Bohaté Málkovice -
Bohdalice-Pavlovice -
Bošovice -
Brankovice - 
Bučovice -
Chvalkovice -
Dětkovice -
Dobročkovice -
Dražovice -
Drnovice -
Drysice -
Habrovany -
Heršpice -
Hlubočany -
Hodějice -
Holubice -
Hostěrádky-Rešov -
Hoštice-Heroltice -
Hrušky -
Hvězdlice -
Ivanovice na Hané -
Ježkovice -
Kobeřice u Brna -
Kojátky -
Komořany -
Kozlany -
Kožušice -
Krásensko -
Křenovice -
Křižanovice -
Křižanovice u Vyškova -
Kučerov -
Letonice -
Lovčičky -
Luleč -
Lysovice -
Malínky -
Medlovice -
Milešovice -
Milonice -
Moravské Málkovice -
Mouřínov -
Němčany -
Nemochovice -
Nemojany -
Nemotice -
Nesovice -
Nevojice -
Nížkovice -
Nové Sady -
Olšany -
Orlovice -
Otnice -
Podbřežice -
Podivice -
Podomí -
Prusy-Boškůvky -
Pustiměř -
Račice-Pístovice -
Radslavice -
Rašovice -
Rostěnice-Zvonovice -
Rousínov -
Ruprechtov -
Rybníček -
Šaratice -
Slavkov u Brna -
Snovídky -
Studnice -
Švábenice -
Topolany -
Tučapy -
Uhřice -
Vážany nad Litavou -
Vážany -
Velešovice -
Vyškov -
Zbýšov -
Zelená Hora

Part of the district area belongs to Military Training Area Březina.

Geography

The district is characterized by a hilly landscape complemented by many valleys. The territory extends into five geomorphological mesoregions: Drahany Highlands (north), Litenčice Hills (west and east), Vyškov Gate (a strip between Drahany Highlands and Litenčice Hills), Ždánice Forest (south) and Dyje–Svratka Valley (small part in the west).

There are many watercourses in the territory, but none significant. The most important rivers are the Litava (a tributary of the Svratka), which flows across the district from east to wets, and Haná, which springs here and flows to the east into the Morava.

There are no large-scale protected areas.

Demographics

Most populated municipalities

Economy
The largest employers with its headquarters in Vyškov District and at least 500 employers are:

Transport
The D1 motorway from Brno to Ostrava leads across the district. The D46 motorway separates from it and leads from Vyškov to Olomouc.

Sights

The most important monuments in the district, protected as national cultural monuments, are:
Bučovice Castle
Slavkov Castle
Homestead No. 12 in Kučerov

The best-preserved settlements and landscapes, protected as monument zones, are:
Slavkov u Brna
Vyškov
Lysovice
Rostěnice
Zvonovice
Battlefield of the Battle of Austerlitz (partly)

The most visited tourist destinations are Dinopark Vyškov and Vyškov Zoo.

References

External links

Vyškov District profile on the Czech Statistical Office's website

 
Districts of the Czech Republic